Anders Ilar (born December 13, 1973) is a Swedish electronic musician, DJ and producer, based in Ludvika.

Biography
Born in Ludvika, Ilar grew up in the little town that is surrounded by woods and lakes, and started playing the piano when he was six. However, he gradually lost interest after he started taking lessons. Instead, he became fascinated with electronic sounds and science fiction, and grew up listening to Depeche Mode, Kraftwerk and Tangerine Dream. 

By the time Ilar was a teenager, he spent most of his time playing with various dance routines, synthesizers, sequencers and drum machines, resulting in an almost endless number of tracks recorded on tape. Never feeling satisfied with the quality of his productions, he decided to take a break in 1997.

After some time, Ilar was introduced to a new way of producing music — computer software. After making a few tracks, he decided to start producing again. He got in contact with the German label Plong!, and was able to make his first official release. Since then, his output has spanned many electronic styles — from the dubwise techno explorations for Echocord, via the blissful ambience of Everdom, through to the deeper abstractions of his Audio.nl pieces, and the darkside acid techno on DSP and Narita.

From 1993 to 1997 Ilar lived in Östersund, Sweden, and from May 1997 until February 2014 he resided in Gothenburg on the Swedish west coast. He has since relocated back to Ludvika.

Discography

Albums

 The title Vidare is a pun in Swedish; "Anders ilar vidare" translates to "Anders hurries on."
 While Wavefunction Formula was set to be released November 18, 2010, a mispress seems to have delayed the actual release.

12"s and EPs

Remixes

Compilations

Compilation appearances

External links
 pine sky

Swedish male musicians
People from Ludvika Municipality
Living people
1973 births